Robin Lynne Kelly (born April 30, 1956) is an American politician from Illinois who has served as the U.S. representative from  since 2013. A Democrat, Kelly served in the Illinois House of Representatives from 2003 to 2007. She then served as chief of staff for Illinois State Treasurer Alexi Giannoulias until 2010. She was the 2010 Democratic nominee for state treasurer, but lost the general election. Before running for Congress, Kelly served as the Cook County chief administrative officer. After winning the Democratic primary, she won the 2013 special election to succeed Jesse Jackson Jr. in the U.S. House of Representatives.

Early life and education
The daughter of a grocer, Robin Lynne Kelly was born in Harlem on April 30, 1956. Hoping to become a child psychologist, she attended Bradley University in Peoria, Illinois, where she was a member of Sigma Gamma Rho sorority. At Bradley, she obtained her Bachelor of Arts in psychology (1977/1978) and her Master of Arts in counseling (1982). While in Peoria, she directed a "crisis nursery" and worked in a hospital.

Kelly earned her Ph.D. in political science from Northern Illinois University in 2004.

Early career 
From 1992 through 2006, Kelly served as a director of community affairs in Matteson.

Illinois House of Representatives

Elections
In 2002, Kelly defeated a ten-year incumbent Illinois state representative in the Democratic primary. In November, she defeated Republican Kitty Watson, 81%–19%.

In 2004, she won reelection to a second term, defeating Republican Jack McInerney, 86%–14%. In 2006, she won reelection to a third term unopposed.

Committee assignments
Appropriations-Human Services
Housing & Urban Development
International Trade & Commerce
Local Government
Mass Transit (Vice Chair)
Para-transit
Whole

State and county government
In January 2007, Kelly resigned her House seat to become chief of staff to Illinois Treasurer Alexi Giannoulias. She was the first African-American woman to serve as chief of staff to an elected constitutional statewide officeholder. Kelly was appointed Cook County President Toni Preckwinkle's chief administrative officer in 2011.

2010 Illinois treasurer election 
In 2010, Kelly ran for Illinois treasurer. In the Democratic primary, she defeated founding member and senior executive of the Transportation Security Administration Justin Oberman, 58%–42%. She won most of the counties in the state, including Cook County with 59% of the vote.

In the November general election, Republican State Senator Dan Rutherford defeated her 50%–45%. She won just six of the state's 102 counties: Cook (62%), Alexander (52%), Gallatin (51%), St. Clair (50%), Calhoun (49%), and Rock Island (48%).

U.S. House of Representatives

2013 congressional election

Kelly entered the field for Illinois's 2nd congressional district after Democrat Jesse Jackson Jr. resigned three weeks after being elected to a tenth term. On February 11, 2013, two Chicago-based Democratic congressmen, Bobby Rush and Danny K. Davis, endorsed her.

On February 13, U.S. Representative Jan Schakowsky endorsed Kelly. A few days later, New York City Mayor Michael Bloomberg endorsed her and committed $2 million in TV ads supporting her by highlighting Kelly's opposition to the National Rifle Association. She was also endorsed by the Chicago Tribune. On February 17, State Senator Toi Hutchinson decided to drop out to endorse Kelly.

On February 26, Kelly won the Democratic primary in the heavily Democratic, black-majority district with 52% of the vote. In the April 9 general election, she defeated Republican community activist Paul McKinley and a variety of independent candidates with around 71% of the vote.

Tenure
Kelly took office on April 9, 2013, and was sworn in on April 11.

Committee assignments

Committee on Energy and Commerce
Subcommittee on Communications and Technology
Subcommittee on Consumer Protection and Commerce
Subcommittee on Health
Committee on Oversight and Reform
Subcommittee on Civil Rights and Civil Liberties

Caucus memberships
 Congressional Black Caucus
Medicare for All Caucus

Political positions

Syria
In 2023, Kelly was among 56 Democrats to vote in favor of H.Con.Res. 21, which directed President Joe Biden to remove U.S. troops from Syria within 180 days.

Personal life
Kelly lives in Matteson with her husband, Nathaniel Horn. Kelly is a Nondenominational Protestant.

Electoral history

See also
List of African-American United States representatives
Women in the United States House of Representatives

References

External links

Congresswoman Robin Kelly official U.S. House website
Robin Kelly for Congress

|-

1956 births
21st-century American politicians
21st-century American women politicians
African-American Christians
African-American members of the United States House of Representatives
African-American state legislators in Illinois
African-American women in politics
American Protestants
Bradley University alumni
Bradley University people
County officials in Illinois
Christians from Illinois
Democratic Party members of the United States House of Representatives from Illinois
Female members of the United States House of Representatives
Living people
Democratic Party members of the Illinois House of Representatives
Northern Illinois University alumni
People from Matteson, Illinois
Women state legislators in Illinois
21st-century African-American women
21st-century African-American politicians
20th-century African-American people
20th-century African-American women
Illinois Democratic Party chairs